On 16 August 2005, an earthquake struck the east coast of the Japanese island of Honshū at 11.46 am (02:46 UTC) on 16 August 2005, causing damage and power outages. The event registered 7.2 on the moment magnitude scale.

Earthquake characteristics
The earthquake occurred on Tuesday, August 16, 2005, and affected Japan's northeastern coast. It triggered a tsunami warning, and buildings shook 200 miles away in the capital, Tokyo. It was initially estimated to have a moment magnitude of 6.8, and the United States Geological Survey later declared it as a 7.2.

Damage and casualties
A tsunami warning was issued by the Japan Meteorological Agency, but was lifted after only two small waves several centimeters high hit the coast. Casualties included those killed because of a pool roof collapse in Sendai city, Miyagi prefecture. Initial reports indicated 80 people were injured, but it was later reported by state broadcaster NHK that one person was seriously hurt and thirteen were slightly injured. Seventeen thousand people lost power.

Twenty percent of the world's earthquakes are located in Japan. The Japanese have been developing systems for early warning of earthquakes. For people of the city of Sendai who were testing the new earthquake warning system, they received a warning of the earthquake from the Meteorological Agency 16 seconds before it reached the city, providing time to take cover. People in Tokyo received a message one minute before it hit. Such technology has since become much more popular and this quake is credited for that, since it was 60 miles off the coast of Japan and there was time for a warning.

Aftermath
Business resumed within a day. Japan's Earthquake Research committee said that the earthquake was not the big one that was predicted to strike in the next 30 years. Onagawa Nuclear Power Plant was shut down, with reactor-1 restarting Jan 2006, 2 in March 2006, 3 in 2007.

See also
List of earthquakes in 2005
List of earthquakes in Japan

References

Further reading

External links

Headquarters for Earthquake Research
Seismological notes from the Earthquake Research Institute, The University of Tokyo

Earthquakes of the Heisei period
Miyagi Earthquake, 2005
Miyagi earthquake
August 2005 events in Japan
History of Miyagi Prefecture
2005 disasters in Japan